Gunilla Olsson (born 16 December 1947) is a Swedish actress. She has appeared in more than 25 films and television shows since 1962.

Selected filmography
 Badarna (1968)
 Julia Julia (1981)
 False as Water (1985)

References

External links

1947 births
Living people
20th-century Swedish actresses
21st-century Swedish actresses
Swedish film actresses
Swedish television actresses
Actresses from Stockholm